Crazy Safari, also known as The Gods Must Be Crazy III, is a 1991 Hong Kong comedy film, directed by Billy Chan. The film is an unofficial sequel to The Gods Must Be Crazy II and part of a trend of jiangshi films, horror comedies with hopping corpses, that were popular in Hong Kong throughout the 1980s and 1990s. It was followed by Crazy Hong Kong (1993) and The Gods Must Be Funny in China (1994). This was N!xau's first Hong Kong film.

Plot
An ancient but still fleshy Chinese corpse is on auction in England. A young businessman (Sam Christopher Chow) purchases the corpse. The corpse is revealed to be the body of his third great-grandfather and he intends to give it a proper burial in Hong Kong. To keep it from becoming an irrepressible vampire, the descendant hires a good-natured Taoist priest (Lam Ching Ying) to maintain control of the cadaver using a yellow talisman. The young descendant and the Taoist priest decide that the best way to get the valued ancestor home is via a direct flight to Hong Kong on a private jet.

During the flight, the plane malfunctions and an altercation breaks out between the ruthless pilot and the two passengers.
Luckily, they outsmart the pilot and descend from the troublesome plane by using parachutes. The corpse and the two end up separated during the chaos, and they land in Africa.
 
The corpse lands in front of Xixo (N!xau), where he and his tribe are being confronted by a rival clan led by two greedy Caucasians. The corpse's presence scares away the villains. Xixo somehow learns to control the corpse using a bell and he takes it to his tribe. Soon he and his family think of it as a gift from God, as it aids them in various matters, such as bringing down fruit from towering trees.

The descendant and the priest land in a vast and dry area miles away from Xixo's home. Confronting an assortment of African animals, they make their way across the foreign land in search of the corpse and rescue. During this time, the corpse forms a strong bond with the compassionate Xixo and his family. Days later, the descendant and the priest meet Xixo and his family. Not knowing they have the corpse, the two nevertheless stay with them, finding food, water, and shelter. They all abruptly form a solid friendship, despite the language barrier, as they all help out each other when in need.

Days later, the priest figures that the corpse must be nearby, since he connects the strange lack of birds in the area with the ominous close presence of a cadaver. Using magic, he summons the corpse to his hut. Xixo and his family frantically chase the corpse. After the corpse reunites with his descendant, the priest proves to Xixo that it belongs to them, and Xixo eventually agrees. After a few more days of living together, they prepare to part ways with the bushmen and Xixo leads them to the main path to civilisation. However, the rival clan is still after what Xixo's homeland has as a natural abundance: diamonds, as they invade the huts and threaten the residents. The corpse, feeling obligated to aid Xixo and his family, goes back, with the priest and the descendant following. A battle takes place between the villains and Xixo's people, with the corpse managing to chase away one of the ruthless leaders. The priest even summons the spirit of the late Bruce Lee to aid Xixo, and the villains are finally defeated. The priest uses the radio left in the villains' Jeep to contact a helicopter. Before boarding, the priest, the descendant, and the corpse bid farewell to Xixo and his family.

Cast and roles
 N!xau – Xixo the San
 Lam Ching Ying – Master HiSing (Cantonese version), Wise One (English version)
 Sam Christopher Chan – Leo (Cantonese version), Sam (English version)
 Peter Chan Lung – The Vampire (Cantonese version), Ancestor (English version)
 Stephen Chow – Narrator (Cantonese version)
 Ng Man Tat – Narrator (Cantonese version)
 Peter Pau – Mr. Szeto
 Paddy O'Byrne – Narrator (voice: English version)
 Michelle Bestbier – Susan
 Saul Bamberger – Johnson
 Peter Mahlangu – Peter
 Bo Kaesje – Ball
 Christopher Kubheka – Xabo
 Elias Meintjies – Tree

References

External links
 
 
 Crazy Safari at Hong Kong Cinemagic

1991 films
Films about hunter-gatherers
Films set in Botswana
Films shot in Botswana
Botswana films
Hong Kong sequel films
Jiangshi films
1991 comedy films
Mr. Vampire
Hong Kong comedy films
Unofficial sequel films
1990s Hong Kong films